Joseph Silk (born May 24, 1986) is an American politician and businessman who served as a member of the Oklahoma Senate, representing the 5th district from 2015 to 2020. Silk's district included parts of Atoka, Choctaw, LeFlore, McCurtain, and Pushmataha Counties. He was first elected in a 2014 Oklahoma Senate special election and served half of a term before winning reelection to a full four-year term in 2016.

Oklahoma Senate (2015–2020)
Silk served in the 55th Oklahoma Legislature, 56th Oklahoma Legislature, and 57th Oklahoma Legislature.

2020 Congressional campaign
Silk did not seek reelection to the Oklahoma Senate in 2020 and instead sought the Republican Party's nomination for Oklahoma's 2nd congressional district.

References

1986 births
21st-century American politicians
Candidates in the 2020 United States elections
Living people
Republican Party Oklahoma state senators
People from Broken Bow, Oklahoma
People from Mangum, Oklahoma